Brot af Sigurðarkviðu is the remaining 22 stanzas of a heroic Old Norse poem in the Poetic Edda. In the Codex Regius, there is a gap of eight leaves where the first part of the poem would have been found, and also the last part of the Sigrdrífumál. The missing narrative is preserved in the Völsunga saga in prose form with four stanzas of poetry. According to Henry Adams Bellows, the original size of the poem should have been more than 250 stanzas.

References
 Fragment of a Sigurth Lay Henry Adams Bellows' translation and commentary
 Fragments of the Lay of Sigurd and Brynhild Benjamin Thorpe's translation, at Google Books
 The (old) Lay of Sigurd Translated by William Morris and Eiríkr Magnússon.
 Brot af Sigurðarkviðu Sophus Bugge's edition of the manuscript text
 Sigurðarkviða in meiri (Brot af Sigurðarkviðu) Guðni Jónsson's edition with normalized spelling

Nibelung tradition
Eddic poetry
Sources of Norse mythology